Ernest Cole may refer to:

 Ernest Cole (photographer) (1940–1990), South African photographer
 Ernest Cole (cricketer) (1875–1965), New Zealand cricketer
 Ernest E. Cole (1871–1949), American politician
 Ernest A. Cole (1890–1979), British sculptor and printmaker
 Ernest Julian Cole (1916–2000), Canadian politician